China Banking Corporation, commonly known as China Bank, is a Filipino bank established in 1920. It was the first privately owned local commercial bank in the Philippines initially catering to the banking needs of Chinese Filipino businesspeople. It offers various banking services and products related to deposit, investment, trust, cash management, remittance, and financing products and services. It also offers insurance brokerage and bancassurance services through its subsidiary and affiliates.

China Bank was included in the list of one of the "top 100 ASEAN companies in terms of delivering shareholder value" by the American consulting firm Stern Stewart and Company in 2009. It was also awarded the Best Wealth Management House in the Philippines by The Asset Magazine (HK) in 2011. At the 2012 Bell Awards of the Philippine Stock Exchange, China Bank was named as one of the best-governed companies in the Philippines. It was the only bank among the top five awardees in the publicly listed companies category. The Bank was again awarded at the Bell Awards in 2013—one of only two other awardees to have been in the top five twice in a row. China Bank was also a recipient of the Institute of Corporate Director's Gold Award for Corporate Governance in 2011 and 2012.

History

Beginnings

China Bank, founded by Dee C. Chuan, Albino SyCip, Guillermo A. CuUnjieng, Carlos Palanca Sr. and other visionaries, opened its first office at No. 90 Rosario (now Quintin Paredes) Street, Binondo on August 16, 1920, with J.W. McFerran as the first general manager. Shortly afterward, Eugene E. Wing of the International Banking Corporation took over and managed China Bank's operations until 1936. This mixture of cultures represented a seamless merger of Western and Eastern banking policies—an obvious lack during those days when financial institutions governed by Western policies declined credit loans of wealthy Filipino-Chinese businesspeople who operated on the principle of (Hokkien ) or trustworthiness. China Bank recognized the value of sìn-iōng and granted small loans and opened credit accounts with patrons and suppliers without demand for collateral. In 1924, the company completed its headquarters in Binondo, the China Bank Building.

China Bank later opened two overseas branches in China, one in Amoy in 1925 and another in Shanghai in 1929. However, both branches closed in 1944 when political conditions in China became inimical to operations.

When the Japanese occupational forces invaded Manila in 1942, China Bank closed. However, by the end of 1941, the Bank had been making steady deposits and turning over assets to the United States High Commissioner to the Philippines Francis Bowes Sayre Sr. for safekeeping, with the help of the officials of the US Treasury Department of Manila. With these overseas assets and the Bureau of Banking's full cooperation, China Bank reopened in 1945 and was listed on the Manila Stock Exchange in 1947 as among the first local banks to be listed.

China Bank played a key role in post-World War II reconstruction and recovery through its support to businesses and entrepreneurs in critical industries. It opened its first branch outside Manila in Cebu in 1949. In 1969, China Bank computerized its operations, becoming the first bank in Southeast Asia to process deposit accounts online. On the same year, its new headquarters, the 15-storey China Bank Building in Makati, was completed. China Bank upgraded its online system in 1988 and launched the TellerCard ATM account and TellerPhone, the first telephone banking service in the Philippines. In 1990, China Bank, along with seven other banks, set up BancNet, currently the country's largest ATM network.

In 1991, China Bank acquired its universal bank license, ushering an era of expanded banking operations. It launched its consumer loans in 1994, China Bank HomePlus Loan and China Bank AutoPlus Loan, followed by China Check Plus, an interest-earning checking account in 1996.  In the same year, China Bank accessed offshore capital markets for the first time by issuing  Floating Rate Certificate of Deposit (FRCD).

As China Bank invested in new technologies, it launched its Cash Management services in 2004, followed by internet banking (China Bank Online) and remittance services in 2006.

In the same year, China Bank, with 146 branches at the time, embarked on an aggressive branch network expansion program.  Over the last six years, the bank has doubled its nationwide branch network.

Recent developments

China Bank has been involved in strategic alliances to expand and strengthen its operations. In 2007, China Bank entered into a Bancassurance joint venture with The Manufactures Life Insurance Company, one of the leading insurance companies in the world, to form Manulife China Bank Life Assurance Corporation (MCBLife), and acquired the majority shares in Manila Bank, one of the oldest savings banks in the country.

In 2008, China Bank's thrift bank subsidiary China Bank Savings (CBS) began operations. Positioned to be an alternative to traditional banking, CBS targets entry level and start-up customers to asset accumulators, offering products and services that match different life stages, like basic deposit products for those building up their savings, basic loan products to fund personal dreams, and investment products. In 2012, China Bank acquired Pampanga-based Unity Bank, which was merged with CBS in 2014. The acquisition supports the Bangko Sentral ng Pilipinas' Strengthening Program for Rural Banks (SPRB) Plus, which aims to effectively serve the countryside and improve the delivery of financial services to rural communities by strengthening the thrift and rural banking industry. The merger fast-tracked the savings bank's branch expansion program. CBS was targeting 100 branches by 2014.

In September 2013, China Bank forged a deal to acquire a majority stake in Planters Development Bank (Plantersbank), a development-oriented finance institution nationally acclaimed as the country's lead bank for small and medium enterprises (SMEs). The merger was approved in May 2014 by the BSP. CBS will absorb the 78 branches and the two unopened branch licenses of Plantersbank.

To complete its range of product offerings, China Bank entered into a credit card partnership with MasterCard in 2013. China Bank is launching three credit card types under the MasterCard brand in the last quarter of 2014: China Bank Prime, China Bank Platinum, China Bank World MasterCard—all equipped with two of the world's most advanced security technologies: EMV and 3D Secure.

On September 1, 2014, Ricardo R. Chua succeeded Peter S. Dee as president and CEO of China Bank. Dee, who joined the Bank in 1972 and served as president and CEO for 26 years, retired on August 31, 2014, but remains as a director. Chua joined China Bank in 1975, rose through the ranks across various functions, and has served as Chief Operating Officer since 1994. He is also currently a director in the boards of China Bank and subsidiaries China Bank Savings, CBC Properties and Computer Center, Inc., and Plantersbank. He is also a founding director of BancNet, Inc. and remains on the BancNet board as director after serving for several terms as chairman and vice chairman.

Restoration and retrofitting of the China Bank Building in Binondo began in 2018, under the company's Binondo Heritage Restoration Project, to make it LEED compliant and to restore its original prewar facade. Restoration was completed in 2020.

Plantersbank acquisition
In 2013, China Bank forged a deal to acquire a majority stake in Planters Development Bank (Plantersbank), a development-oriented finance institution nationally acclaimed as the country's lead bank for small and medium enterprises (SMEs).

The Plantersbank deal was first introduced to China Bank on May 21, 2013, by Investment & Capital Corporation of the Philippines (ICCP), the exclusive adviser to Plantersbank in the transaction. The Memorandum of Agreement was signed on September 18, 2013. The Monetary Board of the Bangko Sentral ng Pilipinas (BSP) gave its approval-in-principle of Planterbank's merger with either China Bank or CBS on December 13, 2013, and on December 18, 2013, the Share Purchase Agreement was signed. China Bank settled  for the 84.77% capital stock owned by the Tambunting family and related parties and the Dutch development bank FMO on January 15, 2014. On the same date, the new members of the Plantersbank board were elected, and officers of China Bank and CBS were appointed to various board/management committees of Plantersbank. Integration activities have commenced and China Bank is preparing for the tender offer to the minority shareholders of the remaining 15.23% Plantersbank stock.

Plantersbank is a good strategic fit with China Bank as both banks share the same strong commitment to SME finance. The acquisition bolsters China Bank's current strategy in two areas: growing its middle market/SME portfolio and accelerating its network expansion program.

As of March 31, 2014, China Bank has  in resources combined with Plantersbank, ranking fifth largest among domestic private commercial banks in the Philippines; and has 450 branches nationwide (299 China Bank, 73 China Bank Savings, and 78 Plantersbank).

Plantersbank was to continue to operate as a separate entity under the China Bank Group for about a year. China Bank was given three years from the date of the BSP approval, which means up to December 13, 2016, to complete the merger.

Stock rights offering
The shares were listed at the Philippine Stock Exchange on May 13, 2014. The fresh equity will be used to fund the growth in the Bank's loan portfolio, branch network expansion, and technology upgrades.

China Bank is the last major bank to raise capital in recent years. The  stock rights offer marks the first time that China Bank raised capital from stockholders since it had its stock rights offer in August 1996 and March 1997, right before the Asian crisis. Since the start of its branch expansion program in 2006, China Bank has more than doubled its asset size, market reach, and branch network without having to go back to its shareholders for additional capital, until this year's stock rights offering.

Subsidiaries and affiliates
China Bank is divided into the following subsidiaries and affiliates:
China Bank Savings, Inc.
China Bank Properties & Computer Center, Inc.
China Bank Insurance Brokers, Inc.
Manulife China Bank Life Assurance Corporation

Ownership
PCD Nominee Corporation: 47.69%
SM Investments Corporation: 17.27%
Sysmart Corporation: 15.49%
Others: 19.55%

References

External links
China Bank
BancNet

Banks of the Philippines
Companies listed on the Philippine Stock Exchange
Companies based in Makati